Epifanio Brizuela is an Argentine former footballer who played as a forward.

Career 
Brizuela played in the Campeonato Ecuatoriano de Fútbol in 1959 with C.S.D. Macará. He recorded 15 goals for Macara during the 1960 season. In 1963, he played with L.D.U. Quito, and finished as the club's top goal scorer in the Interandino tournament. In 1964, he played abroad in the Eastern Canada Professional Soccer League with Montréal Italica. He was later released and signed a contract with Montreal Cantalia of the National Soccer League. He returned to his former club Montreal Italica for the 1966 ECPSL season. 

In 1967, he played in the Quebec Major Soccer League with Montreal Portuguese. The following season he signed with league rivals Montreal Spania. He re-signed with Spania for the 1969 season. He finished second in the league scoring charts with ten goals during the 1970 season. He continued playing with Spania for three more seasons from 1971 till the 1973 season.

References  
 

Date of birth missing
Association football forwards
Argentine footballers
C.S.D. Macará footballers
L.D.U. Quito footballers
Ecuadorian Serie A players
Eastern Canada Professional Soccer League players
Canadian National Soccer League players